The Bond of 1844 was an agreement signed between Fante chiefs and the British government. It was signed on 6 March 1844 in Ghana, which was then known as the Gold Coast.

It specified a relationship between the British and the local chiefs, who were the main parties in the treaty. The British viewed the agreement as an understanding to take part in the administration of justice and the enforcement of their laws in the local states, but the local leaders saw the agreement as a military and defense contract only.

The bond was signed at Fomena-Adansi, allowing the British to use judicial authority from African courts.

History 
For nearly three centuries European interests on the coast of West Africa were mainly commercial. The British, who had been on the shores of Ghana from as early as 1555, devoted their first 175 years to the building of their trade stations and trading activities, which included the trading of slaves with the locals. This resulted in the rise of two formidable indigenous states, the Fantes who were along the coast and the Asantes in the adjacent forest.

The united Fantes had control of the trade routes to the sea. Trading activities along these routes were on their terms. The Asantes secured control over the supply of gold and slaves to the coastal markets. The distribution of European imports they received in exchange was also managed by the Asantes.

As the Asante kingdom grew in wealth and influence, they sought to eliminate the middle men (the Fantes) from the supply chain. This led to a long period of conflict between the two ethnic groups.

In 1755, the Asantehene, the king of the Asantes (who was at that time Osei Bonsu) began preparing for war with the Fantes. However, he died before preparations could be completed. A twenty-year succession dispute ensued. Eventually Osei Kojo became the leader of the Asantes and carried out a series of attacks against the Fantes.

By early 1806, the main Fante army had been met and utterly subdued by the Asantes. The Asantes would then have authority over some Fante states.

A major consequence was that the Asantehene ordered Asante traders not to visit the forts in Cape Coast belonging to the British, but to deal only with the Dutch and the Danes. This made the British increasingly more concerned about Asante attacks on their coastal traders, as well as on the coastal ethnic groups.

A select committee of the British recommended that measures needed to be put in place to ensure the safety of their people, and a new governor had to be appointed by the British crown. It was also decided that a form of government over the Cape Coast forts should also be instituted. The Gold Coast settlements were soon placed under the governor of Sierra Leone, Sir Charles Macarthy, by 1821. He arrived on the shores of Gold Coast by 1822.

Macarthy inherited a strong likelihood of war with the Asantes, but mistook it to be a local quarrel which could have no effect on the British. He initiated policies unfavourable to the Asantes which included forcing them to release the Fantes they had hostage. Predictably the Asantes later sought revenge.

Asante armies moved south early in 1824 and, on the 21st of January, they met and defeated a small force under Sir Charles Macarthy himself at Adamanso. Sir Charles Macarthy was killed in action. After this incident, the British decided to protect their forts and traders and leave the locals to their own devices, while the Asantes continued to wage war on the Fantes.

Under Lieutenant-Colonel Purdon, the British (with the contribution of the eastern chiefs) won a decisive victory against the Asante at Katamanso on August 7, 1826. This battle would be named the battle of Katamanso. After this, the British tried to bring peace between the Asantes and Fantes, but the coalition of coastal chiefs were unwilling to negotiate.

The British merchants then formed an association or body to protect themselves and their interests. This led to a committee sending out Governor George Maclean in 1830. By February 15, George Maclean assumed the duties of the president of the council of Merchants at Cape Coast. His major task was to ensure peace between the British and the Asantes, as well the Fantes and Asantes. He was able to build a cordial relationship with both parties and ultimately succeeded in bringing peace between all parties by 1831. This led to the expansion of trade and British influence.

Peace with the Asantes also coincided with the work of missionaries, which caused the building of schools especially along the coast. On the political front, the British government seized the opportunity to sign a political arrangement that extended British protection to the signatory confederation of the Fantes in 1844. This would be known as the Bond of 1844. Many divisions of Akyem Kotoku, the Wassaw, and the Agona had also signed the Bond by 1849. The number of states adhering to the bond in the coastal states increased in 1850.

List of signees 
These were the first eight chiefs who signed the treaty:

 Cudjoe Chibboe (Kwadwo Tsibu), King of Denkyira
 Quashie Ottoo (Kwasi Otu), chief of Abrah
 Chibboe Coomah (Tsibu Kuma), chief of Assin
 Gebre (Gyebi), second chief of Assin
 Quashie Ankah (Kwasi Ankra), chief of Donadie
 Awoossie (Ewusi), chief of Domonassie
 Amonoo, chief of Anamabo
 Joe Aggrey, chief of Cape Coast

Impact 
 Protection of individuals and property.
 It brought Gold coast under British colonial rule formally.
 It stopped inhumane practices such as human sacrifice. "Panyarring" was a practice of seizing persons until repayment of debt or kidnapping of hostages of debt.
 Introduction of judicial court system and serious crimes should be tried by British judicial officers, with the chiefs integrating customs of the community to general principles of British rules.'
 
'

References 

1844 in Africa
History of Ghana
Ghana–United Kingdom relations